Richard Tauwhare (born 1 November 1959) was the tenth Governor of the Turks and Caicos Islands, serving from 11 July 2005 to 16 July 2008. He succeeded Governor Jim Poston.

Originally from Woking, United Kingdom, Mr Tauwhare has held several government posts around the world. Educationally, he attended Abingdon School  and obtained an MA in History from Cambridge University. He can speak the Swahili language.

Mr Tauwhare is married and has three children.

See also
 List of Old Abingdonians

References

External links
 Profile and photo from official government web site

1959 births
Living people
Governors of the Turks and Caicos Islands
People educated at Abingdon School